Lonne Elder III (December 26, 1927 – June 11, 1996) was an American actor, playwright and screenwriter. Elder was one of the leading African American figures who informed the New York theater world with social and political consciousness. He also wrote scripts for television and film. His most well known play, Ceremonies in Dark Old Men won him a Drama Desk Award for Most Promising Playwright and was nominated for the Pulitzer Prize. The play, which was about a Harlem barber and his family, was produced by the Negro Ensemble Company in 1969.

In 1973, Elder (alongside Suzanne de Passe, who co-wrote Lady Sings the Blues) became the first African Americans to be nominated for the Academy Award in writing. Elder received the Best Adapted Screenplay nomination for the movie Sounder, starring Cicely Tyson, Paul Winfield, and Kevin Hooks and directed by Martin Ritt.

Early life

Born in Americus, Georgia, to Lonne Elder II and Quincy Elder, Elder grew up in impoverished conditions during the Great Depression. As a small child, his mother encouraged him to read and, he reported that storytelling often occupied his mind. In an interview with Liz Gant in Black World he said:

“Actually, I first started writing when I was about six or seven years old, though not with the idea of being a "writer". I don’t think I even knew what a writer was. I just liked the idea of writing to myself; it was a way of expressing feelings that I didn’t know how to express in other ways, like talking. There was no one to whom I could convey those kind of thoughts and emotions in the environment I grew up in."

Due to tragic circumstances, Elder was orphaned at a young age and his aunt and uncle in Jersey City, New Jersey continued his upbringing, along with that of his four siblings. His uncle was a numbers runner, and Elder followed him on his rounds, collecting betting slips. Elder completed his formal education and attended The New Jersey State Teachers' College (now The College of New Jersey) in Trenton in 1949, but dropped out before the end of his freshman year. He then moved to New York's Harlem neighborhood, took classes at the New School for Social Research, and became involved in the growing civil rights movement. In 1952, Elder was drafted into the United States Army, where he served for two years.

The middle years

Acting, writing, and A Raisin in the Sun
Returning from the army, Elder immersed himself in the Harlem literary scene, receiving direct encouragement from poets Robert Hayden and Langston Hughes, among others and began honing his talent as a writer. Working as a stage actor, Elder landed the role of Bobo in the original Broadway run of Lorraine Hansberry's A Raisin in the Sun in 1959. Inspired by Hansberry and his friendship with dramatist Douglas Turner Ward, Elder set his sights on becoming a playwright.

Sharing an apartment with Ward also helped inspire Elder to write a play titled A Hysterical Turtle in a Rabbit Race (1961). It was an early expression of Elder's chosen theme of the black family in a hostile America. Elder married Betty Gross in 1963 and the couple had a son, (David Dubois Elder) but they divorced four years later. He continued to make a living as a gambler, an actor, and other odd jobs. In 1965, he appeared in a production of his play Day of Absence.

That same year his play Ceremonies in Dark Old Men was given a reading at Wagner College on Staten Island. The reading of the play propelled him to a fellowship in screenwriting at the Yale University School of Drama in 1966 and 1967, and won him several financial awards. His one-act play Charades on East Fourth Street, which depicted a clash between community members and police, was performed at the Expo ’67 World’s Fair in Montreal, Canada. Elder served as director of the new Negro Ensemble Company's playwrights’ division from 1967 until 1969, and when they launched their first season at New York's St. Mark's Playhouse in 1969, Ceremonies in Dark Old Men was selected for production.

Ceremonies in Dark Old Men and early success
The Negro Ensemble Company’s Ceremonies in Dark Old Men was one of the most meaningful theatrical events of the late sixties, a culmination of Elder’s meditations on the black family unit in a hostile American society. Edith Oliver from The New Yorker stated in her review, “Ceremonies is the first play by Lonne Elder III to be done professionally, and if any American has written a finer one I can’t think what it is.” James Baldwin wrote, Ceremonies in Dark Old Men is the most truthful play I have seen in a long time. Everyone connected with it deserves a prize, especially the author, Lonne Elder III."'

Ceremonies garnered positive reviews, and was the runner-up for the 1969 Pulitzer Prize in drama, along with several other drama awards. The play deals with a 1950s Harlem family—Russell B. Parker, a barber (portrayed by Ward in the original production) who spends most of his time reminiscing about his glory days as a vaudeville dancer, his two unemployed sons, who live on the edge of the law, and his daughter, who resentfully supports the family.  Elder said in the New York Times:

“I wrote to write, out of my guts and my heart, I wanted to cause some kind of wonder in the minds of people. I don’t rant or rave about the terror of our racist society. It is never directly stated, it is just there.”

By the time it was revived in 1985, the New York Times noted, “the play had become a contemporary classic.” The subsequent productions of the play nurtured the stage careers of several prominent actors, including Denzel Washington, Billy Dee Williams, Keith David, and Laurence Fishburne. A profound influence on the works of August Wilson and films such as Crooklyn and Boyz n the Hood, Ceremonies remains the definitive black American family drama and the blueprint for how to tell that story.

Sounder and writing in Hollywood
Elder married actress Judyann Elder in 1969, and the two had a son, Christian. He moved the family to Los Angeles to pursue an already burgeoning career writing for television. His first motion picture assignment was adapting William H. Armstrong's novel Sounder into a screenplay to be directed by acclaimed director Martin Ritt. The movie, a story about a poor family of Southern sharecroppers in the Great Depression, enjoyed instantaneous success. Pauline Kael, in her review of Sounder, wrote: "The director, Martin Ritt, working from a scrupulous, unsentimental script by Lonne Elder III, based on the William H. Armstrong novel, avoids charging up the scenes [...] the movie earns every emotion we feel. And I think it will move audiences – move them truly, that is – as few films ever have." The film garnered four nominations at the 45th Academy Awards including Best Adapted Screenplay. Elder was the first African-American male to receive this honor and went on to write the sequel.

In the blaxploitation era, Elder scripted the most challenging example of the genre, a noir-infused crime melodrama called Melinda; it starred actors Calvin Lockhart and Rosalind Cash.

In 1980, Elder and his wife welcomed a third child to the family, a daughter they named Loni-Christine. The following year his collaboration with Richard Pryor resulted in the screenplay for Bustin' Loose,
 a comic tale of an ex-felon who finds redemption through driving a busload of handicapped children to a farm-land oasis. The movie received mixed reviews. He wrote A Woman Called Moses, the biographical TV mini-series of fugitive slave leader Harriet Tubman’s life, reuniting him with Cicely Tyson and featuring narration by Orson Welles.  A Woman Called Moses garnered Elder the Writers Guild of America Award and his second Christopher Award.

Last years

In the 1980s Elder became disillusioned with Hollywood. Perhaps a result of his efforts to change the way black people were depicted in films and television, he was kept on the payroll by studio employers but denied work on important projects. “They decided they were going to teach me a lesson, and for two years I couldn’t get arrested,” he told the Washington Post.

Elder returned to the theatre bringing Splendid Mummer to The American Place Theater in New York starring Charles S. Dutton, a monodrama about the 19th century life of the first African-American Shakespearean actor, Ira Frederick Aldridge. Splendid Mummer was revived in 2007 at The Old Vic Theatre in London, England. In 1990 he was called in to re-write the book version of King, a British musical about the life of the Rev. Dr. Martin Luther King Jr. Lonne Elder died in Woodland Hills, California, on June 11, 1996, after a long illness.

Works

Poetry
1957: Scenes in the City (edited by Langston Hughes) A Modern Jazz Symposium of Music and Poetry

Plays
1961: A Hysterical Rabbit in a Turtle Race
1966: Kissing Rattlesnakes Can Be Fun
1966: Seven Comes Up and Seven Comes Down
1967: Charades on East Fourth Street 
1969: Ceremonies in Dark Old Men
1988: Splendid Mummer

Musicals
1990: King (Book)

Film
1972: Sounder
1973: Melinda - Lt. Daniels
1976: Part 2, Sounder
1981: Bustin' Loose (with Richard Pryor and Roger L. Simon)

Television
1955: Camera Three
1968: N.Y.P.D. (series): "Deadly Circle of Violence"
1970—1971: McCloud (series)
1973: Toma (series): "Blockhouse Breakdown"
1975: Ceremonies in Dark Old Men (TV movie)
1978: A Woman Called Moses (mini-series)
1982: Thou Shalt Not Kill (TV movie)
1989: Runaway (TV movie)
1992: I'll Fly Away (series): "The Third Man"

Acting filmography
 1970: Soul! (TV series) (as himself)
 1972: Pomroy's People (TV movie)
 1973: Melinda (as Lt. Daniels)

Honors and awards
 Pulitzer Prize for Drama nomination (1969) – Ceremonies in Dark Old Men Best Adapted Screenplay (1973) Academy Award nomination – Sounder The Stanley Drama Award  – Ceremonies in Dark Old Men The USC Film Conference Award of Merit
 The Atlanta Film Festival Silver Award
 The Outer Critics Circle Award for Drama  – Ceremonies in Dark Old Men The Vernon Rice/Drama Desk Award – Ceremonies in Dark Old Men The Stella Holt Memorial Playwrights Award – Ceremonies in Dark Old Men The Los Angeles Drama Critics Circle Award  – Ceremonies in Dark Old Men The Christopher Award – Sounder, A Woman Called Moses Black Filmmakers Hall of Fame Award (1979)
 The Writers Guild of America Award – A Woman Called Moses The America Historical Society Award
 The NAACP Image Award (1981) – Bustin' Loose''

References

External links
 
 FBI file on Lonne Elder III
 
 

1927 births
1996 deaths
African-American male actors
People from Americus, Georgia
Male actors from Jersey City, New Jersey
20th-century American male actors
Screenwriters from New Jersey
20th-century American dramatists and playwrights
American male dramatists and playwrights
Writers from Jersey City, New Jersey
20th-century American male writers
Male actors from Georgia (U.S. state)
Screenwriters from Georgia (U.S. state)
20th-century American screenwriters
20th-century African-American writers
African-American male writers